Robert Ainslie may refer to:

Robert Ainslie (rugby union) (fl. 1879–1882), Scottish rugby union football player
Sir Robert Ainslie, 1st Baronet (1730–1812), Scottish ambassador to the Ottoman Empire, orientalist and numismatist
Robert Ainslie (lawyer) (1766–1838), Scottish lawyer, writer and correspondent of Robert Burns
Sir Robert Ainslie, 2nd Baronet of the Ainslie baronets (1777–1858)